Darren Shawn Greer (born January 1, 1968) is a Canadian writer.

Born in Halifax, Nova Scotia, Greer lived in several small towns, including Greenfield, Queens County, Nova Scotia and Liverpool, Nova Scotia before moving to Ontario in 1990. He attended the University of King's College and Carleton University where he studied English literature. He lived in Ottawa, Toronto and San Francisco before moving back to Nova Scotia in 2010.

Novels and other writings

Greer's first novel, Tyler's Cape, was published in 2001 to critical acclaim and was on the bestseller list of The Chronicle Herald. His second novel Still Life With June was a critical success, earning him the ReLit Award in 2004.  The novel was also a finalist for the Pearson Canada Reader's Choice Award and the Ferro-Grumley Award in Manhattan. The book was optioned for film in 2007 by Amaze Film and Television and published in the U.S. by St Martin's Press. His long-awaited third novel, Just Beneath My Skin, was released by Cormorant Books in May 2014. It was shortlisted for the Jim Connors Dartmouth Book Award and won the 2015 Thomas Raddall Atlantic Fiction Award. He has also written for Maclean's Magazine, the Ottawa Citizen, Bywords Magazine, the Stockholm Review of Literature, Found Press, the Found Poetry Review and the Gay and Lesbian Review and in 2005 published a book of 16 essays in the categories of memoir, political science and contemporary art. In a review of the essays in Books in Canada Canadian author and critic T.F. Rigelhof called Greer "one of the most joyously alive, vibrant young writers in the country." His fourth novel Advocate was released by Cormorant Books in July 2016.

Awards and nominations

Winner of the 2017 Jim Connors Dartmouth Book Award for Advocate.
Short-listed for the 2017 Thomas H Raddall Atlantic Fiction Award for Advocate.
Short-listed for the 2017 Ferro-Grumley Award for Advocate.
Winner of the Thomas Raddall Atlantic Fiction Award for 2015 Just Beneath My Skin
Shortlisted for the Jim Connors Dartmouth Book Award 2015 for Just Beneath My Skin
One Book Nova Scotia pick 2015 for Just Beneath My Skin.
Shortlisted for the 2015 Relit Award for Just Beneath My Skin.
Shortlisted for Ferro-Grumley Award 2005 for Still Life With June 
Nominated for People's Choice Award 2004 at Word On The Street Toronto 
Winner of the 2004 Relit Award for Still Life With June.

Bibliography 
Tyler's Cape (2001)
Still Life With June (2004)
Strange Ghosts (2005)
Just Beneath My Skin (2014)
Advocate (2016)
Outcast (2018)

References

External links 
Cormorant Books Canada
St. Martin's Press
The Blog of Darren Greer
World Atlas: Famous Nova Scotians 

1968 births
Canadian male novelists
Writers from Halifax, Nova Scotia
Living people
Canadian gay writers
Canadian LGBT novelists
21st-century Canadian novelists
21st-century Canadian male writers
21st-century Canadian LGBT people
Gay novelists